Requena is a municipality in eastern Spain, in the province of Valencia, located on the left bank of the river Magro.

The town used to be a Moorish fortress, occupying a strong position in the mountainous region of Las Cabrillas (1000 metres). It is dominated by the ancient citadel of the Moors, and still has traces of the original town walls. There are three ancient parish churches; San Nicolás, the oldest, dates from the 13th century, but was partly restored in 1727. Near the town are the sulphurous springs of Fuentepodrida.

List of settlements included in the municipality 
 Barrio Arroyo
 Calderón
 Campo Arcís
 Casas de Cuadra
 Casas de Eufemia
 Casas de Sotos
 Casas del Río
 El Azagador
 El Derramador
 El Pontón
 El Rebollar
 Fuen Vich
 Hortunas
 La Portera
 Las Nogueras
 Los Cojos
 Los Duques
 Los Pedrones
 Los Ruices
 Los Isidros
 Penén de Albosa
 San Antonio
 San Juan
 Roma
 Villar de Olmos

Demography

Notable places of interest 

 Iglesia del Carmen, Requena
 San Sebastian, Requena

External links

Images of Requena

References

Municipalities in the Province of Valencia
Requena-Utiel